The South Broad Street Historic District in Rome, Georgia is a  historic district which was listed on the National Register of Historic Places in 1983.  The listing included 41 contributing buildings.

It includes large houses on South Broad Street, built of brick and frame, built during 1880 to 1910.

References

Historic districts on the National Register of Historic Places in Georgia (U.S. state)
National Register of Historic Places in Floyd County, Georgia
Victorian architecture in Georgia (U.S. state)
Buildings and structures completed in 1880